The Lyon-Vaise Hoard is a 3rd-century ancient Roman hoard of precious objects, found in Lyon (Roman Lugdunum) in 1992 and now on display in the Gallo-Roman Museum of Lyon. It includes dishes, jewellery, statuettes and coins. It was buried for fear of Germanic raids and the coins in it allow its burial to be dated to after 258 (perhaps during the 259 raid).

Some pieces are displayed in the Gallo-Roman Museum of Lyon:

Roman Lyon
Treasure troves of France
Treasure troves of late antiquity
9th arrondissement of Lyon
Ancient Roman jewellery